"Here Comes the King" is a well-known advertising jingle written for Budweiser, whose slogan is "The King of Beers." Budweiser is the flagship brand of the Anheuser-Busch brewery.

Copyrighted in 1971, the music and lyrics are by Steve Karmen, who also wrote six other jingles for Anheuser-Busch. The song is often heard as the theme for the brand's winter-themed TV commercials featuring the Budweiser Clydesdale horses pulling the Budweiser beer wagon.

"When You Say Budweiser, You've Said It All"
Another Budweiser jingle, "When You Say Budweiser, You've Said It All," also with music and lyrics by Steve Karmen, was published a year earlier in 1970, and part of its lyric inspired "Here Comes the King."

The underlying instrumental is imitative of a stereotypical Bohemian polka band. Its style resembles the famous Coca-Cola jingle "I'd Like to Teach the World to Sing" in that it begins with a lone voice, joined by another singer, and eventually a choral group (Both songs can be heard on the CD, Tee Vee Toons: The Commercials). Many of the lines are punctuated at the end by a double drumbeat.

The award-winning anthem was a hit from the moment it first aired. Sonny & Cher recorded a song titled, "When You Say Love", written by two country songwriters using the tune of this jingle, and in 1972, it reached number 32 on the Billboard Hot 100 chart and number 2 on the Easy Listening chart. (Karmen successfully sued the songwriters for copyright infringement.) In 1976 and 1977, the Budweiser company was sponsoring Lou Rawls's live shows, and Rawls could be heard at the time singing on television commercials for the company.

Popular culture

"Here Comes the King" can be heard at the end of the seventh inning during all St. Louis Cardinals home games and at different times during the game (mainly when the team is in a rally). During the period when Anheuser-Busch owned the Cardinals, it was played instead of "Take Me Out to the Ball Game" during the seventh-inning stretch, with Take Me Out to the Ball Game being played in the eighth inning. It is also played at St. Louis Blues home games. Saint Louis University also takes to playing the song during half-time of home basketball games. The SLU pep-band plays the song while the student section sings the lyrics.

The tuba section of the Florida State University Marching Chiefs, The Royal Flush, plays "Here Comes the King" while entering any time that they perform as a section.

Georgia Tech bands play "When You Say Bud" regularly at GT sporting and alumni events. The band first played the song in 1970 as a tribute to then-head coach Bud Carson, and the tradition has remained strong. "Bud" is played between the 3rd and 4th quarters at football games, during the second half of Tech basketball games, as well as during volleyball matches, and as part of the 7th inning stretch in baseball games.

The University of Wisconsin–Madison's band also plays the song at sporting events, changing the last line to "When you say WIS-CON-SIN, you've said it all!"  The song has been known to sway the upper deck of Camp Randall Stadium because fans dance the polka when the song is played.

Also, the Keith Stein Blue Thunder Marching Band of Boise State University plays the song at various events, usually following the school's fight song. Keith Stein, the owner of the Anheuser-Busch wholesaler in Boise, is a prominent supporter of Boise State University, and the band hall bears his name.

The Arizona State University Sun Devil Marching Band once played this song when they received sponsorship from the local Anheuser-Busch distributor. Since then, the campus and stadium have "gone dry," or stopped serving alcoholic beverages, and the song has fallen out of favor. The alumni band still plays the song in recognition of the past.

A Budweiser commercial featuring the jingle appears in the 1977 film, Close Encounters of the Third Kind on Roy Neary's (Richard Dreyfuss) TV, as he models Devil's Tower in his living room. Subsequently, a couple of Budweiser commercials with both jingles also appeared in the 1985 film Beer, a comedy film that satirizes advertising.

See also
When You Hear Lou, You've Heard It All 1977 Lou Rawls album
Lou Rawls Live 1978 Lou Rawls live album, which includes a short performance of the original "When You Say Budweiser, You've Said It All" jingle

References

External links
TV commercial containing the "Here Comes the King" jingle.
The original 1970 "When You Say Budweiser, You've Said It All" commercial

Anheuser-Busch advertising
Jingles
St. Louis Cardinals
American advertising slogans
1971 songs